Aldonza Martínez de Silva (Portuguese: Aldonça Martins da Silva; died after 1236)  a Portuguese noblewoman, daughter of Martim Gomes da Silva and his wife Urraca Rodríguez, was one of the mistresses of King  Alfonso IX of León and afterward, the wife of Diego Froilaz.

She probably arrived in the Kingdom of León in 1191 in the entourage of Infanta Theresa of Portugal for her wedding with King Alfonso IX. She had very influential relatives in the Kingdom of Portugal, including her aunt, Estefanía da Silva and her husband Martim Fernandes de Riba de Vizela, who were the tutors of the future King Sancho II of Portugal, and Estêvão Soares da Silva, the powerful Archbishop of Braga.

In 1214 she became the lover of Alfonso IX in a relationship that lasted until 1218 when the king became involved with Teresa Gil de Soverosa. Afterwards, she married Diego Froilaz, a marriage probably arranged by the king who gave the couple several properties in Pesquera and Villamarín. These estates were later claimed in 1230 by King Ferdinand III of León but were returned to Aldonza and her husband in 1232 when it was confirmed that these had been donated by King Alfonso to his former mistress.

She last appears in medieval charters in 1236 when, accompanied by her children, she donated several properties to the Monastery of Carracedo.

Issue 
Before her affair with King Alfonso IX, she had a son named Fernando Johannis, who, according to his patronymic, would have been the son of an individual named Juan (John), perhaps someone from Galicia or León who was a member of the royal court.

The children from her relationship with King Alfonso IX were:

 Rodrigo (ca. 1214ca. 1268), lord of Aliger and Castro del Río, and Adelantado of the March of Andalusia,  he married Inés Rodríguez, daughter of Rodrigo Fernández de Valduerna, Lord of Cabrera and alférez of King Alfonso IX.
 Aldonza (died after 1267). Married Count Pedro Ponce de Cabrera, and had issue.  They are the ancestors of the Ponce de León family.
 Teresa Alfonso of León, the wife of Count Nuño González de Lara el Bueno.   

After 1218, she married Diego Froilaz, son of Count Froila Ramírez and his wife Sancha Fernández. They had the following children:

 Ramiro Díaz de Cifuentes (died after 1279),  Lord of Asturias de Santillana, married Teresa Fernández de Lara, daughter of Fernando Álvarez de Lara and Teresa Rodríguez de Villalobos.
 Sancha Díaz de Cifuentes, the wife of Rodrigo Álvarez de Lara, an illegitimate son of Álvaro Núñez de Lara and Teresa Gil de Osorno.  
 Estefanía Díaz
 Urraca Díaz

Notes

References

Bibliography 

 

 
 
 
 
 
 

12th-century births
13th-century deaths
Mistresses of Spanish royalty
12th-century Spanish women
12th-century nobility from León and Castile
13th-century Spanish women
13th-century people from the Kingdom of León